, (born 22 July 1980 in Shizuoka, Shizuoka, Japan) is a Japanese gymnast. He was part of the Japanese team that won the gold medal in the team competition at the 2004 Summer Olympics. He was also part of the team to win the silver medal in the team event at the 2007 World Artistic Gymnastics Championships. At that competition, he also won three individual bronze medals, winning them in the all-around, the floor exercise, and the horizontal bar. He is currently a professor at Keio University, Shonan Fujisawa Campus.

References

External links
 
 
 

1980 births
Living people
Japanese male artistic gymnasts
Medalists at the World Artistic Gymnastics Championships
Olympic gymnasts of Japan
Gymnasts at the 2004 Summer Olympics
Olympic gold medalists for Japan
People from Shizuoka (city)
Nippon Sport Science University alumni
Olympic medalists in gymnastics
Medalists at the 2004 Summer Olympics
Asian Games medalists in gymnastics
Gymnasts at the 2002 Asian Games
Gymnasts at the 2006 Asian Games
Gymnasts at the 2010 Asian Games
Asian Games gold medalists for Japan
Asian Games silver medalists for Japan
Asian Games bronze medalists for Japan
Medalists at the 2002 Asian Games
Medalists at the 2006 Asian Games
Medalists at the 2010 Asian Games
20th-century Japanese people
21st-century Japanese people